USS Partridge (LCIL-1001/LSIL-1001/AMCU-36) was a  of the United States Navy.

The ship was laid down by the Consolidated Steel Corporation, Orange, Texas, on 18 April 1944, launched on 13 May, and commissioned on 10 June 1944 as USS LCIL-1001.

Service history
After shakedown in the Gulf of Mexico, she operated in that area and along the east coast until she decommissioned at Green Cove Springs, Florida, in March 1947.

Established as a Training Ship 
Reclassified as LSIL-1001 in 1949, she recommissioned in 1950. Based at Norfolk, Virginia, she served as a training ship for auxiliary minesweeper crews. Scheduled for conversion to an AMCU minehunter, she was named Partridge and reclassified AMCU-36 on 7 March 1952. However, her conversion was cancelled and she was reclassified and renamed LSIL-1001 in July 1954.

Decommissioning 
Decommissioned in early 1956, she was struck from the Navy List on 7 August 1956 and scrapped.

References

External links
 
 Mine Warfare Vessels

 

AMCU-7-class minesweepers
Ships built in Orange, Texas
1944 ships
World War II amphibious warfare vessels of the United States
Cold War mine warfare vessels of the United States
Training ships of the United States Navy